Perak League is the state football league in Perak. It is one of the fourteen concurrent top-tier state level leagues in the Malaysian football league system and a fourth-tier league at national level. The league is managed by the Perak Football Association (PAFA) and was established in 1932. This league has undergone multiple iterations of structures until its current structure took place.

History

Origin
The first known records of the Perak League are from 1932. The champion for that year was Perak Chinese RC.

Even though the Perak state football league is relatively unknown to outsiders, Perak state has been a source of clubs for Malaysia FAM League for years. Some of the recent teams from Perak that currently and have been competing in the national third division are Ipoh, PKNP, YBU, UPB-MyTeam, TKN and others.

The league has not been managed properly for many years as the governance body of Perak state football, Perak Football Association (PAFA), has been focusing mainly on managing its own state football team and only recently shifted its focus to the Perak state football league again as an effort by PAFA to promote grassroots football in the state of Perak. Although a competitive league should be played for at least six months every year in a single group league, currently the state league has only been played as a tournament format of multiple groups with knockout format at the end of the league. The reasons were due to the lack of management, the lack of infrastructure, and the high cost for a proper league.

In 2014 and 2015, the tournament of the Perak Amanjaya League was held with twenty-four parliamentary teams from around Perak competing in the tournament. A football league in each parliament was also established as a method to find a suitable players to represent their area teams for the state league. Youth football and coaching clinics were also held in the state to further promote furtherance of the league.

In 2016, the league was revamped to feature a team representing the districts in Perak instead of its parliaments. Teams with a district based identity were resurrected again after existing in a long dormant state to be the base of the league in order to promote local area football community. Teams with these ethnic related players also were invited to join in order to promote more players from those ethnic to join the local football scene. The league which was created is now known as the PAFA President Cup, where a total of sixteen teams participated in the league for 2016 season. Thirteen of those teams representing their areas from the district of Perak and three other teams representing the community in Perak.

2014 Perak League

The 2014 was the first season of the new Perak League, Perak Amanjaya League. The tournament was held this year from September 13 to October 2. A total of 24 teams from parliament in Perak competed for the trophy. These teams were divided into eight groups of three. This tournament use a round-robin system for the group stage followed by a knockout format for the semi-finals and final to decide the winners.

The 2014 edition was won by Lumut.

2015 Perak League

In 2015, the Perak Amanjaya League was the second season of the new Perak League. The tournament was held from September 22 to November 7. As in 2014, twenty-four teams from parliaments in Perak competed for the trophy. Again, these teams were divided into eight groups of three and the tournament used a round-robin system for the group stage followed by a knockout format for the semi-finals and final to decide the winners.

The 2015 edition was won by Ipoh Timor.

2016 Perak League

Beginning with the 2016 tournament, the league was revamped to feature a team representing the districts in Perak, rather than those of its parliaments. This league, now known as PAFA President Cup, featured sixteen teams participating in the league. All sixteen teams were the affiliates of Perak Football Association. Thirteen of those teams represented their area from the district of Perak and three others team represented the community of Perak.

Teams were divided into four groups.

Group A
Ipoh
Kampung Gajah
Kampar
Batu Gajah
Group B
Tanjung Malim
Kerian
Gerik
PCRC
Group C
Perak Tengah
Lenggong
Batang Padang
MSIP
Group D
Hilir Perak
Melayu Perak
Kuala Kangsar
Manjung

External links

References

4
Sport in Perak